Devour is a co-op PvE horror video game created by developers Straight Back Games, playable by between 1 and 4 players. The game was released in 2021.

Setting and plot
Players, who are members of a cult, become aware that the cult leader Anna is trying to raise the demon Azazel. The players attempt to intercede, only to find that Anna has been possessed by the demon.

Later maps follow a similar basis - different characters from the cult attempt to meddle in the demonic, it backfires, and other cult members arrive to attempt to undo the damage.

Gameplay
The core mechanic of Devour is the destruction of ten totems (whether goats, eggs, or rats). For the original two maps "Farmhouse" and "Asylum", this takes the form of finding a fuel item and then destroying the totem with it. For the later maps "Inn" and "Town", the totems themselves must be prepared at one location before being destroyed at another, slowing progress.

Threats to the player come in two forms - the primary demon of the specific map and swarms of lesser hostiles. The primary demon moves around the full map, before switching into pursuit of a player. If successful, the player is downed and will be dragged to a random location on the map. The speed, rate of pursuit, and difficulty to stagger, all increase as totems are destroyed. The lesser hostiles spawn in randomly across the map. Unlike the primary demon, they require several seconds of contact to down a player and can be directly destroyed by the player. As totems are destroyed, spawn rate increases significantly. In the event that all party members are simultaneously downed, the game is lost.

Players can resist being downed by fleeing hostiles or by use of the UV-mode of the flashlight each carries. This is a finite, recharging, resource that destroys lesser hostiles and can stagger the primary demon. The amount of time required to stagger the primary demon increases over time.

There are additional items found around each map. These include keys to open up the map, with some rooms not being available until one or more totems are destroyed. It also includes medkits to resuscitate downed party members and batteries as an additional UV source.

Development
Devour was created by Joe Fender & Luke Fanning, the two developers of indie game studio Straight Back Games as their second game. Originally released on the 28th January 2021 with the single map "Farmhouse", three additional free maps have been released, starting with the spider-oriented "Inn" in September 2021.

Reception
Reception for the game has been generally positive, with particular focus on its frightening atmosphere, good value, and positive referrals to Phasmophobia, which entered early access four months prior to the release of Devour. Gamesradar approved of its "highly stressful, fast-paced, downright scary experience".

References

External links 
Devour - Official website

2020s horror video games
2021 video games
Multiplayer and single-player video games
Video games about cults
Video games about demons